Henri Fescourt (23 November 1880 – 9 August 1966) was a French film director. He directed some 40 films in his career.

Filmography
 1912 : Un vol a été commis
 1912 : Le Petit restaurant de l'impasse Canin
 1912 : Paris-Saint-Pétersbourg, minuit trente-cinq
 1912 : La Méthode du professeur Neura
 1912 : La Loi de la guerre
 1912 : L'Amazone masquée
 1913 : La Voix qui accuse - Épisode 2: L'aiguille d'émeraude
 1913 : La Voix qui accuse - Épisode 1: Gaston Béraut
 1913 : Un obus sur Paris
 1913 : Son passé
 1913 : PS 32, Bureau 9
 1913 : Pourquoi?
 1913 : La Marquise de Trévenec
 1913 : La Mariquita
 1913 : Les Joyeuses noces de Saint-Lolo
 1913 : Les Deux médaillons
 1913 : Le Départ dans la nuit
 1913 : Le Crime enseveli
 1914 : Les Sept suffragettes de Saint-Lolo
 1914 : Fleur d'exil
 1914 : La Fille de prince
 1916 : Suzanne et les vieillards
 1921 : La Nuit du 13
 1921 : Mathias Sandorf
 1923 : Rouletabille chez les bohémiens
 1924 : Les Grands
 1924 : Mandrin 
 1924 : A Son from America
 1925 : Les Misérables
 1927 : L'Occident
 1927 : La Maison du Maltais
 1927 : La Glu
 1928 : Karina the Dancer
 1929 : Monte Cristo
 1929 : Colette the Unwanted
 1930 : La Maison de la flèche
 1931 : Serments
 1932 : Night Shift 
 1937 : L'Occident
 1938 : Bar du sud
 1938 : The West
 1939 : Vous seule que j'aime
 1940 : Face au destin
 1943 : Retour de flamme

PUBLICATIONS

La Foi et les Montagnes ou le septième art au passé, Paris, P. Montel 1959

L'Idée et l'Ecran. Opinions sur le cinéma (avec Jean-Louis Bouquet), Paris 1925-26

Le Cinéma des origines à nos jours (sous la direction de H. Fescourt), Paris, éditions du Cygne, 1932, 3 vol.

Les Maudits. Drame en trois actes. Paris, Ed. de la Nouvelle Revue, 1908

External links 

French film directors
Silent film directors
French male screenwriters
20th-century French screenwriters
1880 births
1966 deaths
People from Béziers
20th-century French male writers